was a public junior college in Shinagawa, Tokyo, Japan.

Academic departments
 Mechanical engineering
 Electrical engineering
 Product management

See also 
 Tokyo Metropolitan University
 Tokyo Metropolitan Junior College of Aeronautic Engineering

References
 『全国短期大学受験要覧1970 昭和45年度版』（廣潤社）16頁 
 『全国短期大学高等専門学校一覧1987 昭和62年度版』199頁 

Japanese junior colleges
Universities and colleges in Tokyo